The A250 road is a minor British A-road on the Isle of Sheppey in Kent. The route runs from Sheerness to Queenborough via Halfway.

Route

The A250 begins in Queenborough where it splits off from the A249, with the formerly northbound A249 turning northwest towards Blue Town and the A250 heading northeast on the Queenborough Road towards Halfway.

When the route reaches a set of traffic lights in the middle of Halfway, it abruptly turns to the northwest towards Sheerness onto Halfway Road. It used to continue straight on towards Minster, but this route is now designated as the B2008.

Halfway Road continues all the way to Sheerness, where it then becomes Sheerness High Street. Within Sheerness, westbound and eastbound traffic are split by the town's one-way system. While westbound traffic follows the High Street, eastbound traffic diverges at the western end of the town onto the Broadway before following Trinity Road, Cavour Road and finally Invicta Road to rejoin the High Street at the eastern end of the town.

Following the A250 west, it passes Sheerness-on-Sea railway station, becoming Bridge Road as it does so. A little further along Bridge Road comes a roundabout where the A250 re-encounters the A249 which spawned it. This roundabout marks the termination point of both routes.

References

External links

Roads in Kent